Auguste Louis Brot (September 18, 1821 - August 30, 1896) was a Swiss malacologist (conchologist).  

After several years of studies in Zurich, Paris, and Berlin, he earned the degree of Doctor in Medicine in 1845. Soon he became deeply interested in natural history, abandoned medicine, returned to Geneva and became a malacologist, with a special interest in terrestrial and aquatic molluscs. For  over 40 years he was associated with the Natural History Museum of Geneva.

He was an elected correspondent (1887) of the Academy of Natural Sciences of Philadelphia. 

He is a conchological taxon authority and the namesake of the Brotia genus of freshwater snails.

The Geneva museum keeps his book collection and his extensive conchological collection.

Monographs
1880: Die Gattung Paludomus auct. (Tanalia, Stomatodon, Philopotamis, Paludomus) (Melaniaceen)
1874: Systematisches Conchylien-Cabinet Die Melaniaceen : (Melanidae) ; in Abbildungen nach der Natur mit Beschreibungen.
1874: Die Melaniaceen (Melanidae) in Abbildungen nach der Natur mit Beschreibungen
1870: Catalogue of the Recent Species of the Family Melanidae
1868: Additions et corrections au catalogue systématique des escèces qui composent la famille des Mélaniens
1868: Matériaux pour servir a l'étude de la famille des Melaniens
1867: Étude sur les coquilles de la famille des nayades qui habitent le bassin du Léman
1862 Matériaux pour servir à l'étude de la famille des mélaniens. Catalogue systematique, Volume 1
1860: Description de nouvelles espèces de mélanies

References

1821 births
1896 deaths
Swiss malacologists
Conchologists